Actor, director, producer, and screenwriter Tom Hanks has been honored with numerous awards and nominations, including two consecutive Academy Awards for Best Actor for Philadelphia (1993) and Forrest Gump (1994). He is one of two actors to receive them consecutively, the other being Spencer Tracy. Tom Hanks has won a total of 50 awards on this list. He has received the AFI Life Achievement Award in 2002. He received the Stanley Kubrick Britannia Award for Excellence in Film from the British Academy of Film and Television Arts in 2004. In 2014, he received a Kennedy Center Honor, and in 2016, he received a Presidential Medal of Freedom from President Barack Obama, as well as the French Legion of Honor. In 2020, he received the Golden Globe Cecil B. DeMille Award.

Hanks made his starring film debut in Ron Howard's romantic comedy Splash (1984). During the eighties he starred in various comedies including Bachelor Party (1984), The Money Pit (1986), Nothing in Common (1986), Dragnet (1987), The 'Burbs (1989), and Turner & Hooch (1989). He made his breakthrough with in Penny Marshall's Big (1988) for which he earned an Academy Award for Best Actor nomination. Hanks' soon became known as a romantic leading man with his films with Meg Ryan, Joe Versus the Volcano (1990), Sleepless in Seattle (1993), and You've Got Mail (1999). In 1996, he directed the comedy That Thing You Do! (1996). He also is known for voicing Woody the Cowboy in the Toy Story franchise.

During the 1990s he excelled in critically acclaimed dramas such as Penny Marshall's A League of Their Own (1992), Jonathan Demme's Philadelphia (1993), Robert Zemeckis' Forrest Gump (1994), Ron Howard's Apollo 13 (1995), Steven Spielberg's Saving Private Ryan (1998), and Frank Darabont's The Green Mile (1999). Since the turn of the 21st century, Hanks' continued working in dramatic films, including Cast Away (2000), Road to Perdition (2002), Catch Me if You Can (2002), The Terminal (2004), Charlie Wilson's War (2007), Cloud Atlas (2012), Captain Philips (2013), Saving Mr. Banks (2013), Bridge of Spies (2015), Sully (2016), The Post (2017), A Beautiful Day in the Neighborhood (2019), Greyhound (2020), and News of the World (2020). He also starred in The Da Vinci Code (2005), Angels & Demons (2009), and Inferno (2015).

He is also known for his work as a producer and director on various television series including From the Earth to the Moon (1998), Band of Brothers (2005), John Adams (2008), and The Pacific (2009). For his work in television he has earned seven Primetime Emmy Award wins. He is also known for his work on stage having trained as a Shakespearean Actor acting in productions at the Lakewood Civic Auditorium from 1977 to 1979. In 2013, he made his Broadway debut in Nora Ephron's Lucky Guy earning a Tony Award for Best Actor in a Play nomination.

Major award associations

Academy Awards

British Academy Film Awards

Emmy Awards (Primetime)

Golden Globe Awards

Screen Actors Guild Awards

Tony Awards

Others

Saturn Awards

American Film Institute

American Comedy Awards

AACTA Awards

Critics' Choice Awards

Critics' Choice Super Awards

Chicago Film Critics Association

Detroit Film Critics Society

Empire magazine

Satellite Awards

London Film Critics' Circle

MTV channel

Nickelodeon channel (Kids' Choice)

Online Film Critics Society

People's Choice Awards

Producers Guild of America

San Diego Film Critics Society

St. Louis Gateway Film Critics Association

Miscellaneous

See also
 List of Tom Hanks performances

References

Awards
Hanks, Tom